Darius Harrison, also known by his stage name, as "DEEZLE", is an American record producer, rapper and singer.

Music career
He was born and raised in New Orleans, Louisiana. Deezle has garnered many industry accolades for his creative works—including co-producing Lil Wayne's hit single "Lollipop", which lead to a grammy win alongside Jim Jonsin. From this, Deezle's credits, music contributions, and numerous artistic collaborations expanded significantly. This included co-authoring Drake's hit "In My Feelings", engineering Chris Brown's single "Gimme That" & "Graffiti", producing Lil Wayne's hit album "Tha Carter III",  as well as sharing a co-producing credit with Kanye West on "Let the Beat Build". Ever since his start as a producer, engineer and artist in the music industry, he has sold over seventy-five million records. In addition to records, Deezle has also made musical contributions alongside Donald Harrison to movie scores such as: Right to Return and Rachel Getting Married by Academy Award–winning filmmaker, Jonathan Demme.

Legal issues
In 2011, Dezzle filed a lawsuit against Young money and Cash money records claiming he is owed millions.

Awards and Nominations

Grammy Awards

2008
Best Rap Songwriter-"Lollipop" by Lil Wayne
Best Rap Album Producer-"Tha Carter III" by Lil Wayne

Engineering in the field of music.

Production, engineering, and songwriting credits

2004 
Destiny's Child – Destiny Fulfilled
02. "Soldier" (featuring T.I. and Lil Wayne) (engineering credit)

T.I. – Urban Legend
16. "Stand Up" (featuring Lil Jon, Trick Daddy and Lil Wayne) (engineering credit)

2005 

Lil Wayne – Tha Carter II
17. "Weezy Baby" (featuring Nikki)

Trina – Glamorest Life
02. "Don't Trip" (featuring Lil Wayne) (engineering credit)

The Longest Yard – The Longest Yard
02. "Shorty Bounce"

Avant – Director

01. "You Know What" (featuring Lil Wayne) (engineering credit)

Birdman – Fast Money
01. "Intro"
07. "Shovlin Snow" (featuring Curren$y, Mack Maine and Lil Wayne)
09. "Get It All Together" (featuring Lil Wayne)
10. "We Got That" (featuring Six Shot)
13. "Out the Ghetto" (featuring Magnolia Chop)
14. "Around the World"

2006 
Yung Joc – New Joc City
05. "Don't Play Wit It" (featuring Big Gee)

Chris Brown – Chris Brown
18. "Gimme That" (featuring Lil Wayne) (engineering credit)

Birdman and Lil Wayne – Like Father, Like Son

18. "Stuntin' Like My Daddy"  (engineering credit)

Lloyd – You
01. "You" (featuring Lil Wayne) (engineering credit)

Robin Thicke – The Evolution of Robin Thicke
12. "Shooter" (featuring Lil Wayne) (engineering credit)

Donald Harrison – 3D Volume I Smooth Jazz
01. "The Magic Touch"
02. "Now Is the Time"
03. "Chillin' at the Penthouse"
04. "All My Love"
05. "Soul to Soul"
06. "A Beautiful Day"
07. "Dreamgirl"
08. "Eddie Palmieri"
09. "Step in the Name of Love" (R. Kelly cover)
10. "Now Is the Time" (Instrumental)
11. "Rainy Nights"

2007 
Sean Kingston – Beautiful Girls single
01. "Beautiful Girls (Remix)" (featuring Fabolous and Lil' Boosie) (engineering credit)

Wyclef Jean – "Sweetest Girl (Dollar Bill)" single

01. "Sweetest Girl (Dollar Bill)" (featuring Akon and Lil Wayne) (engineering credit)

Mary J. Blige – Just Fine single

01. "Just Fine (Treat 'Em Right Remix)" (featuring Lil Wayne and Swizz Beatz) (engineering credit)

Shop Boyz – "Party Like a Rockstar"

18. "Party Like a Rockstar" (featuring Lil Wayne and Chamillionaire) (engineering credit)

Mario – Crying Out for Me
00. "Crying Out for Me (Remix)" (featuring Lil Wayne) (engineering credit)

Trina – Single Again single

00. "Single Again (Remix)" (featuring Lil Wayne, Rick Ross and Plies) (engineering credit)

Playaz Circle – Duffle Bag Boy single
00. "Duffle Bag Boy (Remix)" (featuring Juelz Santana, Birdman and Lil Wayne) (engineering credit)

Birdman – 5 * Stunna
03. "I Run This" (featuring Lil Wayne) (engineering credit)
06. "100 Million" (featuring Jeezy, Rick Ross and Lil Wayne) (engineering credit)
07. "Believe Dat" (featuring Lil Wayne) (engineering credit)
09. "Grind" (featuring Lil Wayne and Brisco) (engineering credit)
13. "Pop Bottles" (featuring Lil Wayne) (engineering credit)
17. "Make Way" (featuring Lil Wayne and Fat Joe) (engineering credit)
18. "So Tired" (featuring Lil Wayne) (engineering credit)

2008 
Lil Wayne – Tha Carter III
09. "Mrs. Officer" (featuring Bobby V)
10. "Let the Beat Build" (co-produced by Kanye West)
12. "Lollipop" (featuring Static Major) (co-produced by Jim Jonsin and Static Major)
15. "You Ain't Got Nuthin" (featuring Juelz Santana and Fabolous) (co-produced by The Alchemist)
00. "Action"
00. "Lollipop (Remix)" (featuring Kanye West and Static Major) (co-produced by Jim Jonsin and Static Major)
00. "Prostitute 2" (co-produced by Maestro)
00. "Whip It"
00. "Showtime"
00. "Eat You Alive"

Shawty Lo – Dey Know single

01. "Dey Know (Dirty South Remix)" (featuring Ludacris, Young Jeezy, Plies and Lil Wayne) (engineering credit)

Keri Hilson – Turnin' Me On single

01. "Turnin' Me On (Original Dirty)" (featuring Lil Wayne) (engineering credit)

Flo Rida – Mail on Sunday
01. "American Superstar" (featuring Lil Wayne) (engineering credit)

Robin Thicke – Something Else
12. "Tie My Hands" (featuring Lil Wayne) (engineering credit)

Rick Ross – Trilla
00. "Speedin' (We the Best Remix)" (featuring R. Kelly, DJ Khaled, Plies, Birdman, Busta Rhymes, DJ Drama, Webbie, Gorilla Zoe, Fat Joe, Torch, Gunplay, DJ Bigga Rankin', Flo Rida, Brisco and Lil' Wayne) (engineering credit)

Lloyd – Lessons in Love
02. "Girls Around the World" (featuring Lil Wayne) (engineering credit)

Bun B – II Trill
03. "Damn I'm Cold" (featuring Lil Wayne) (engineering credit)

Kevin Rudolf – Let It Rock single

01. "Let It Rock" (featuring Lil Wayne) (engineering credit)

Ludacris – Theater of the Mind

11. "Last Of A Dying Breed" (featuring Lil Wayne) (engineering credit)

The Game – LAX
05. "My Life" (featuring Lil Wayne) (engineering credit)

Usher – Here I Stand
16. "Love In This Club,Pt. II" (featuring Lil Wayne) (engineering credit)

T-Pain – Can't Believe It single

01. "Can't Believe It" (featuring Lil Wayne) (engineering credit)

Solange – Sol-Angel and the Hadley St. Dreams (Deluxe)
17. "ChampagneChroniKnightcap" (featuring Lil Wayne) (engineering credit)

2009 
D Boyz – Life of a D-Boy
05. "Work to Move" (featuring Jazze Pha)
06. "Ballin' in My City"
00. "It's Yo Money"

Eminem – Relapse:Refill
01. "Forever" (featuring Drake, Kanye West and Lil Wayne) (engineering credit)

Drake – So Far Gone
01. "I'm Goin' In" (featuring Lil Wayne) (engineering credit)

Chris Brown – Graffiti
01. "I Can Transform Ya" (featuring Lil Wayne and Swizz Beats) (engineering credit)

2011 
Jay Sean – Hit the Lights
01. "Hit the Lights" (featuring Lil Wayne) (engineering credit)

2012 
DMX – Undisputed
05. "Sucka for Love" (featuring Dani Stevenson)

N.O.4 – The Beginning
04. "Tell Ya Friends" (featuring DMX and Dani Stevenson)

2013 
Teena Marie – Beautiful
00. "The Love Game"

Master P – Al Capone
02. "My Life" (featuring Alley Boy and Fat Trel)
07. "Gangstas Need Love Too" (featuring Alley Boy, Fat Trel and Bride)
09. "Scared of Me" (featuring Krazy and Tory) (co-produced by 1500)
10. "We All We Got" (featuring Alley Boy and Fat Trel) (co-produced by 1500)
13. "Block Party" (featuring Calliope Var and Alley Boy)
14. "Friends with Benefits" (featuring Kirko Bangz)
15. "Kit Kat Bars" (featuring Alley Boy and Fat Trel)

2014 
Jennifer Lopez – A.K.A.

Chris Brown – X
10. "Time For Love"

2018 
Drake – Scorpion
 21. "In My Feelings" (co-author)

Andres Castillo – eClectrónico

 01. "Let's Groove" (featuring Derek Figueroa and Deezle)
 02. "Here We Go Again" (featuring Deezle)
Mr. Pig – One More Kiss
 01. "One More Kiss" (featuring Deezle)

2019 
Deezle – The Best Is Yet To Come

01. "I Got A Feelin'"
02. "My Hands On Your Body"
03. "Self Medicated" (featuring Tifa)
04. "Show Is" (featuring Kay Klover and Raw Reem)

Mastachi – Tonight
.01 "Tonight" (featuring Deezle)

Marissa Kaye – Rhythm of the Night

01. "Rhythm Of The Night" (featuring Deezle)

Dylan Kenjiro] – Ese Flow

01. "Ese Flow" (featuring Deezle)

Nito Favel] – Coco Piña

01. Jozvan Vera "Por Favor" (featuring Deezle)

Jozvan Vera -Por Favor feat Deezle

01. "Coco Piña" (featuring Deezle)

Derek Figueroa – Muévete

01. "Muévete" (featuring Deezle, Claudio Zayas, and Deelio)

2020 
Claudio Zayas – Regreso Atras

 01. "Regreso Atras" (featuring Sebastian Martingaste, and Deezle)

Deezle – Merry Christmas

 01. "Merry Christmas" (featuring Robby Swervin)

2021 
Deezle – Cash Talk

 "Cash Talk" (featuring YNZ 1000)

Deezle – Brand New Whip That's Foreign

 01. " Brand New Whip That's Foreign" (featuring Junior Montana)

Deezle – Sex Sounds

 01. "Sex Sounds"

Deezle – November in La

 01. "November in LA"

Dylan Kenjiro – Re Bien (remix)

 01. "Re Bien – Remix" (featuring Deezle, Barbie Mur, and Alex Guillen)

References

External links 



20th-century American rappers
American hip hop DJs
Hip hop record producers
Living people
Businesspeople from New Orleans
Year of birth missing (living people)
21st-century American rappers